Hippo Valley Estate is a sugar estate found near the town of Chiredzi in Chiredzi District of southeastern Zimbabwe, on the Runde River near the border with Mozambique.

Background 

It was established in 1956 as a citrus estate and soon it diversified with the first cane planted three years later in 1959. Canned Hippo Valley fruit was exported across southern Africa until the 1970s. In the wake of the sugar marker crush in 1975, the estate initiated irrigation programs to water its sugar plantations. Today, it is the major producer of sugar and in conjunction with Triangle Estate, has a fifty:fight holding in nearby Mkwasine Estate.

Operations 

The sugar plantations cover 124 square kilometres, and the company employs around 5,000 people. The Cane sugar mill of Hippo Valley Estate has a capacity of 300,000 tonnes of sugar per year, mostly raw sugar and brown sugar. It also produces molasses which is then turned into ethanol. It is a major employer of the residents of Tshovani, the lone high density suburb in Chiredzi.

Stock exchange 

The company is a publicly listed company on the Zimbabwean Stock Exchange (under the ticker HIPPO). Tongaat Hulett Sugar is the largest shareholder via its wholly owned subsidiary Triangle Sugar and owns 50.35% of Hippo Valley Estates. Other shareholders include Tate & Lyle, the British agro company (10%).

Relationship with Chiredzi 

The company has a special relationship with the town. In addition to providing schools and healthcare facilities, it also supplies all the water used in the town. It also provides employment to the locals and thereby increasing their standard of living.

Farm invasions 

In 2004, parts of the estate were listed for confiscation by the government of Zimbabwe as part of its land reform project. Hippo valley is an estate encompassed by the triangle estate and the mkwasini estate, all of them producers of sugar plantation. With the advent of farm invasions that started in 2000, many changes have occurred to the estate as some parts of it have been taken over by peasants.

References

External links
 Tongaat Hulett Sugar
 Triangle Sugar

Masvingo Province
Companies listed on the Zimbabwe Stock Exchange
Agriculture companies of Zimbabwe
Chiredzi District
Sugar companies
1955 establishments in the Federation of Rhodesia and Nyasaland